Group E of the 2019 AFC Asian Cup took place from 8 to 17 January 2019. The group consisted of Saudi Arabia, Qatar, Lebanon and North Korea. The top two teams, Qatar and Saudi Arabia, advanced to the round of 16. However, third-placed Lebanon missed out qualification to the knockout stage by fair play points to Vietnam.

Saudi Arabia were the only former champions in the group, having won three Asian Cup titles in 1984, 1988 and 1996.

Teams

Notes

Standings

In the round of 16:
 The winners of Group E, Qatar, advanced to play the runners-up of Group D, Iraq.
 The runners-up of Group E, Saudi Arabia, advanced to play the winners of Group F, Japan.

Matches
All times listed are GST (UTC+4).

Saudi Arabia vs North Korea
The first chance of the game came in the 13th minute through Abdulaziz Al-Bishi’s left-footed strike which just missed the target. In the 28th minute, Hattan Bahebri dribbled past Ri Il-jin and sent a curler from the left to give Saudi Arabia the lead. Housain Al-Mogahwi’s free kick from just outside the box sailed into the box and Mohammed Al-Fatil diverted it into the net with a back heel to double Saudi Arabia’s advantage. Just a minute before the break, Han Kwang-song received a second yellow card for a tackle on Al-Mogahwi. North Korea were reduced to 10 men but they came close to scoring in the 64th minute through captain Jong Il-gwan. However, the Saudi defenders regrouped to deny him. Moments later, Saudi Arabia had a missed opportunity, when Fahad Al-Muwallad side-stepped defender Kim Chol-bom and goalkeeper Ri Myong-guk but his shot flew wide. In the 70th minute, Salem Al-Dawsari was left unmarked and the Saudi captain made no mistake from the centre of the box to make it 3–0. In the 87th minute, defender Kim Song-gi failed to clear Hamdan Al-Shamrani’s cross into the box and Al-Muwallad slammed the ball into the back of the net to seal Saudi Arabia’s first opening AFC Asian Cup match win since they emerged champions in 1996.

Qatar vs Lebanon

In the 37th minute, Ali Hamam raced off to celebrate with his teammates after slotting Hassan Maatouk's corner into the Qatari goal, only for the referee to controversially blow the whistle for a foul on Tarek Salman. Maatouk pulled the trigger on an effort of his own just before half-time, but his scissor kick flew high over the bar. Two minutes after the hour mark, 2018 AFC Player of the Year Abdelkarim Hassan was introduced from the bench for Abdulkarim Al-Ali and within three minutes, the Qataris took the lead from Bassam Al-Rawi's strike from a free kick. The defender sent a dipping, curling right-footed effort over the wall and beyond the outstretched hand of Mehdi Khalil. Qatar added a second with 11 minutes remaining. Hassan's driving run created space for Akram Afif and, when the winger received the ball, his centre found Abdulaziz Hatem, whose shot was saved by Khalil. But Almoez Ali was on hand to roll the ball into the empty net to ensure a winning start to the campaign for Qatar.

Lebanon vs Saudi Arabia

Saudi Arabia found their breakthrough in the 12th minute when they latched onto a defensive mistake. Lebanon’s Joan Oumari’s back pass deflected off teammate Alexander Michel Melki’s left boot. The ball landed near Saudi Arabia’s Fahad Al-Muwallad, who half-volleyed home from close range. Oumari failed to keep his header down in the 16th minute, while Felix Michel Melki just missed Hassan Maatouk’s free kick eight minutes later. After the break, Hattan Bahebri took a chance from almost 30 yards out which forced a save from goalkeeper Mehdi Khalil. Bahebri made an assist in the 67th minute, when his cross into the box found Housain Al-Mogahwi, who made it 2–0. This win earned Saudi Arabia a ticket to the round of sixteen for the first time since the 2007 edition, in which Saudi Arabia finished runners-up.

North Korea vs Qatar
Qatar were in front in the ninth minute when Akram Afif glided past Sim Hyon-jin before delivering a low cross to Almoez Ali, who struck past Ri Myong-guk. Qatar doubled their lead two minutes later, when Abdelkarim Hassan’s ball found Hassan Al-Haydos, whose low centre was struck in the goal from close range by Ali. Ri Un-chol tried from outside the area, but his drive narrowly failed to find the top corner. With just two minutes remaining in the first half, Afif lifted the ball high over the advancing Myong-guk and Boualem Khoukhi headed in from close range. Ali completed his hat-trick 10 minutes into the second half with a finish from Afif’s through ball. Five minutes later, Afif led a counter-attack before rolling the ball through to Ali, who smashed his shot across Myong-guk and inside the far post. Ali turned provider in the 68th minute when his pass allowed Hassan to storm through the North Korean defence and slot home Qatar’s sixth. The East Asian side’s misery was compounded in the last minute when Jong Il-gwan was shown a second yellow card.

It was North Korea’s heaviest ever defeat at the Asian Cup, surpassing their previous 0–4 defeat to Saudi Arabia in their opening 2019 Asian Cup match. Qatar’s win enabled them to progress to the knockout stages for the first time since the 2011 edition that they hosted. Controversy rose around the empty stadium as very few fans were allowed to enter.

Saudi Arabia vs Qatar
Mohammed Al-Owais parried away Boualem Khoukhi's drive on 16 minutes in the first genuine threat to either goal. Housain Al-Mogahwi shot over the bar for Saudi Arabia following Yahya Al-Shehri's probing run and cross, before Fahad Al-Muwallad struck an upright with Qatar goalkeeper Saad Al-Sheeb beaten. Hassan Al-Haydos' 42nd minute penalty was saved by Al-Owais. However, minutes later, Abdulaziz Hatem's through ball found Almoez Ali who converted to open the scoring on the stroke of half-time. Within five minutes of the restart Hattan Bahebri forced Al-Sheeb into a save. Bahebri's effort from 15 yards fizzed narrowly over the bar on 73 minutes. Qatar extended their lead with 10 minutes remaining, when Ali leaped to thump home a header from Hatem's corner. It proved to be the final genuine goalmouth action as Qatar held on to seal another three points.

The match was dubbed the "Blockade Derby", in reference to the diplomatic disputes between the two nations. However, there was no on-field incidents and the match ended in a friendly atmosphere.

Lebanon vs North Korea
Pak Kwang-ryong converted his free kick in the ninth minute to give North Korea an early advantage. However, Lebanon levelled the score just before the half hour mark when Hassan Maatouk dribbled down the left before laying off for Felix Michel Melki, who smashed the ball into the back of the net. Hilal El-Helwe’s effort was cleared off the line in the 32nd minute. Felix came close to scoring his second in the 57th minute but angled his header across the bar. In the 65th minute, Mohamad Haidar’s cross found El-Helwe who turned to score from close range. North Korea conceded a penalty after Rabih Ataya was brought down in the danger area. Maatouk converted the spot-kick in the 80th minute, sending goalkeeper Ri Myong-guk the wrong way, with a fourth coming in the eighth minute of added time through El-Helwe as Lebanon won their first ever Asian Cup match. However, they were edged by Vietnam in the third-place ranking on fair-play points due to receiving more yellow cards and were eliminated from the tournament. This loss extended North Korea's winless streak, with their last win dating back to their fourth place finish in the 1980 edition.

Discipline
Fair play points were used as tiebreakers if the head-to-head and overall records of teams were tied (and if a penalty shoot-out was not applicable as a tiebreaker). These were calculated based on yellow and red cards received in all group matches as follows:
yellow card = 1 point
red card as a result of two yellow cards = 3 points
direct red card = 3 points
yellow card followed by direct red card = 4 points

Only one of the above deductions was applied to a player in a single match.

References

External links
 

Group E
Group E
2018–19 in Saudi Arabian football
2019 in North Korean football
2018–19 in Qatari football